Soulby is a hamlet in the civil parish of Dacre, near the villages of Dacre and Pooley Bridge and the A592 road, in the Eden district, in the English county of Cumbria. In the Imperial Gazetteer of England and Wales of 1870-72 it had a population of 66. The name "Soulby" means "village near the fork or joining of two rivers".

References 

 Philip's Street Atlas (page 84)

External links 
  Cumbria County History Trust: Dacre (nb: provisional research only - see Talk page)

Hamlets in Cumbria
Dacre, Cumbria